Cletus J. Vanderperren (March 4, 1912September 24, 1994) was an American farmer and politician.  A Democrat, he served 34 years in the Wisconsin State Assembly, representing Green Bay and northern Brown County.  At the time of his retirement, he was the longest-serving member in the history of the Wisconsin Assembly.  His legislative service earned him the nickname Concrete Clete for his efforts to fund roads, highways, and bridges throughout the state.

Early life and career
Vanderperren was born on March 4, 1912, in Pittsfield, Wisconsin.  He was educated at the Mills Center school and attended University of Wisconsin–Madison, though he did not graduate. He worked as a farmer for most of his life.

Political career
Vanderperren became involved in local politics over the issue of farm-to-market roads and was elected to the Pittsfield Town Board in 1947.  He would ultimately serve on the Town Board for the next 30 years, and would be chairman for many of those years.  Shortly after his election to the Town Board, in 1951, he was elected to the Brown County Board of Supervisors, and would continue to serve on this board until 1966.

In 1956 he made his first attempt to run for Wisconsin State Assembly in Brown County's 3rd Assembly district, which at that time covered almost all of Brown County outside of Green Bay, Preble, and Allouez.  He won a close contest in the Democratic primary but fell short of Republican Edward A. Seymour in the general election.

Vanderperren returned for a rematch in 1958, and this time narrowly defeated Seymour, taking 52% of the vote in the midterm election year.  Despite difficult elections in his original district, where he rarely received more than 52% of the vote, Vanderperren would go on to win reelection sixteen times through three redistrictings.

Legislative Legacy
During his time in the Assembly, Vanderperren was known for his advocacy for road, highway, and bridge construction and maintenance and served as Chairman of the Assembly Highways Committee for 20 years (1973–1993).   After his death, a friend, former state senator Jerome Van Sistine, said that Vanderperren was motivated by the deaths of friends in car accidents, particularly on Wisconsin Highway 29, which they referred to as "The Bloody '29". Vanderperren was the driving force behind the construction of four different bridges over the Fox River—the Allouez-Ashwaubenon, the Donald E. Tilleman, the Tower Drive bridge, and the Walnut Street bridge.  He was also instrumental to funding for construction of U.S. Route 41, Interstate 43, and Wisconsin Highway 172.

One of his other longtime priorities in the legislature was the development of opportunities for higher education in the Green Bay area.  He was a longtime advocate for the creation of a University of Wisconsin System branch at Green Bay, which he achieved in a 1965 law in collaboration with Kenosha representative George Molinaro and with the support of Republican Governor Warren P. Knowles.  The law ultimately established the University of Wisconsin–Green Bay and the University of Wisconsin–Parkside.  He also assisted in the creation of Northeast Wisconsin Technical College.

He was also instrumental in the creation of Heritage Hill State Historical Park in Brown County, which contains a number of structures listed in the National Register of Historic Places.

Personal life and family
Vanderperren was married twice.  His first wife, Viola, suffered from Von Willebrand disease and required frequent blood transfusions.  Her condition led Vanderperren to push for state subsidies for blood transfusions.  They married on November 24, 1934, and had four daughters together before her death in 1975.  Vanderperren subsequently married Cora Stencil, who survived him.

Vanderperren died at Grancare Nursing Center in Green Bay, Wisconsin, on September 24, 1994.  At his bedside when he died were his family and his friend, former state senator Jerome Van Sistine. He had seven grandchildren and three great grandchildren at the time of his death.  He was preceded in death by his daughter, Betty, who died of Leukemia in 1992.

Due to his advocacy for the creation of the a University of Wisconsin branch at Green Bay, and for his support over the years, the University of Wisconsin–Green Bay named a dormitory building in his honor, known as Cletus Vanderperren Hall.

Electoral history

Wisconsin Assembly, Brown 3rd district (1958–1970)

Wisconsin Assembly, 89th district (1972–1980)

Wisconsin Assembly, 53rd district (1982)

Wisconsin Assembly, 89th district (1984–1990)

References

External links
 
 Heritage Hill State Park
 Cletus Vanderperren Hall at University of Wisconsin–Green Bay

 
|-

 

 

 

People from Brown County, Wisconsin
County supervisors in Wisconsin
Democratic Party members of the Wisconsin State Assembly
University of Wisconsin–Madison alumni
1912 births
1994 deaths
20th-century American politicians